The Chalon language is one of eight Ohlone languages, historically spoken by the Chalon people of Native Americans who lived in Northern California. Also called Soledad, it belongs to the one of the Ohlone (or Costanoan) languages of the Utian family. Recent work suggests that Chalon may be transitional between the northern and southern groups of Ohlone languages.

Notes

References

 Kroeber, Alfred L. 1925. Handbook of the Indians of California. Washington, D.C: Bureau of American Ethnology Bulletin No. 78. (map of villages, page 465)
 Merriam, C. Hart. Village Names in Twelve California Mission Records, assembled and edited by Robert F. Heizer. Reports of the University of California Archaeological Survey Number 74. Department of Anthropology, University of California at Berkeley, 1968.
 Milliken, Randall. A Time of Little Choice: The Disintegration of Tribal Culture in the San Francisco Bay Area 1769–1910 Menlo Park, CA: Ballena Press Publication, 1995.  (alk. paper)
 Milliken, Randall. Ethnohistory of the Rumsen. Papers in Northern California Anthropology No. 2. Salinas, CA: Coyote Press, 1987.
 Teixeira, Lauren. The Costanoan/Ohlone Indians of the San Francisco and Monterey Bay Area, A Research Guide. Menlo Park, CA: Ballena Press Publication, 1997. .

External links
 Chalon language overview at the Survey of California and Other Indian Languages
Chalon Dictionary

Ohlone languages
Extinct languages of North America

hr:Chalon